Fathers' Rights-Responsibility Party was an Irish political party, led by Liam Ó Gógáin and formed in 2007. It did not register with the Clerk of Dáil Éireann (a legal requirement for entities seeking to form political parties in the Republic of Ireland) and thus it contested the 2007 general election with 8 candidates running as Independents. They polled 1,355 first preference votes in total in that election but did not win any seats. The party campaigned on fathers' rights issues in Ireland "growing from what it argues are injustices against fathers within the courts system."

References 

Defunct political parties in the Republic of Ireland
Fathers' rights
Masculism
Political parties established in 2007
Political parties disestablished in 2010
2007 establishments in Ireland
2010 disestablishments in Ireland